Max Oppenheimer (1 July 1885 – 19 May 1954), later known as MOPP, was an Austrian painter and graphic artist.

Life 

Oppenheimer was born in Vienna on 1 July 1885. He studied from 1900 to 1903 at the Akademie der Bildenden Künste in that city studying under Christian Griepenkerl and Siegmund L'Allemand, and then – from 1903 to 1906 – at the Academy of Fine Arts of Prague, where he studied under Franz Thiele. Along with Egon Schiele, with whom he shared a studio in 1910 and Oskar Kokoschka he was considered as being one of Austria's leading avant-garde artists. His work was influenced by several different movements including expressionism, cubism and futurism. His work was included in 2 art exhibitions in 1908 and 1909  in Vienna co-organised by Gustav Klimt. His first one-man show was held in Munich at the Moderne Galerie in  1910. He was known for his portraits of contemporary cultural figures such as Thomas Mann and Arnold Schoenberg.

References

Further reading 

 Echte, Bernhard, ed. Max Oppenheimer (MOPP), 1885–1954: Gemälde und Graphiken. Exh. cat., Bayerische Staatsgemäldesammlungen, Munich. Baden: Stiftung Langmatt Sidney und Jenny Brown, 1995.
 Tobias G. Natter (ed.): MOPP: Max Oppenheimer, 1885–1954. Exh. cat. Vienna: Jewish Museum Vienna, 1994.
 Pabst, Michael. Max Oppenheimer: Verzeichnis der Druckgrafik. Munich: Galerie Michael Pabst, 1993.

19th-century Austrian painters
19th-century Austrian male artists
1885 births
1954 deaths